"Girl on the Trapeze" is the sixth episode of the first series of the 1960s cult British spy-fi television series The Avengers, starring Ian Hendry and Ingrid Hafner, and guest starring Mia Karam, Howard Goorney, and Kenneth J. Warren. It was performed and aired live on ABC on 11 February 1961, and is one of only three series 1 episodes which are currently known to exist, complete.  The episode was directed by Don Leaver, and written by Dennis Spooner.

It is notable as being one of only a handful of Avengers episodes in which the character of John Steed, played by Patrick Macnee (and who, at this point in the series' history, was a supporting character to Hendry's David Keel, not the lead), does not appear.

Plot
Dr. Keel rescues a young woman who tries to commit suicide by jumping into the River Thames. The woman is a trapeze artist with a visiting Central European circus. Foreign agents are trying to use her to force her father, a scientist who defected to Britain, to return to his country home.

Cast
Ian Hendry as Dr. David Keel
Ingrid Hafner as Carol Wilson
Mia Karam as Anna Danilov
Howard Goorney as Supt. Lewis
Kenneth J. Warren as Zibbo
Edwin Richfield as Stefan
Delena Kidd as Vera Korsova
Ivor Salter as Police Sergeant
David Grey as Dr. Sterret
Dorothy Blythe as Box Office Clerk
Ian Gardiner as Policeman
Andy Alston as Turek

Production
The episode was broadcast live on ABC on 11 February 1961.

References

External links
http://www.imdb.com/title/tt0516844/
Episode overview on The Avengers Forever! website

The Avengers (season 1) episodes